Wiley Post–Will Rogers Memorial Airport,  often referred to as Post/Rogers Memorial, is a public airport located in Utqiaġvik (formerly Barrow), the largest city and borough seat of the North Slope Borough of the U.S. state of Alaska. The airport is owned by the state. Situated on the Chukchi Sea at a latitude of 71.29°N, the airport is the farthest north of any in US territory.

Facilities and aircraft

For the 12-month period ending 11 January 2011, the airport had 12,010 aircraft operations, an average of 33 per day: 50% air taxi, 37% general aviation, 12% scheduled commercial and fewer than 1% military. At that time there were eight aircraft based at this airport: one jet, three helicopters, one multi-engine, and three single-engine.

Airlines and destinations

Passenger

Prior to its bankruptcy and cessation of all operations, Ravn Alaska served the airport from multiple locations.

Statistics

Top destinations

References

External links

 FAA Alaska airport diagram (GIF)
 National Weather Service Barrow, Alaska 

WAAS reference stations
Airports in North Slope Borough, Alaska
Cultural depictions of Will Rogers
Utqiagvik, Alaska